This article lists the squads for the 2012 CONCACAF Women's Olympic Qualifying Tournament, to be held in Canada. The 8 national teams involved in the tournament were required to register a squad of 20 players; only players in these squads were eligible to take part in the tournament.

Players marked (c) were named as captain for their national squad. Number of caps, players' club teams and players' age as of 19 January 2012 – the tournament's opening day.

Group A

Canada
Coach:  John Herdman

Costa Rica
Coach:  Karla Alemán

Cuba
Coach:  José Luis Elejalde

Defected

Haiti
Coach:  Ronald Luxieux

Group B

Dominican Republic
Coach:  Rufino Sotolongo

Guatemala

Coach:  Raúl Calderón

Mexico
Coach:  Leonardo Cuéllar

United States
Coach:  Pia Sundhage

References

Squads
Association football women's tournament squads